Simko, Šimko or Simkó is a surname. Notable people with the surname include:

David Simko (born 1954), American racing driver
Imre Simkó (1939–2021), Hungarian sport shooter
Ivan Šimko (born 1955), Slovak politician 
Joe Simko, American illustrator
Julián Šimko (1886–1956), Slovak politician
Kate Simko, American electronic music producer
Marek Šimko (born 1988), Slovak ice hockey player
Patrik Šimko (born 1991), Slovak footballer
Pavel Šimko (born 1982), Slovak triathlete